Albany railway station opened in 1896, closed in 1975,  reopened in 1977 and closed for good in 1978. It was on the Bog Walk to Port Antonio branch line,  from the Kingston terminus, and served the surrounding agricultural community, providing a means for bananas to reach and be exported from Port Antonio. It was destroyed by fire sometime after closure.

Architecture
The station was a single story wooden building with sash windows. The pitched roof was extended to form a canopy over the platform on all four sides of the building.

Track layout
In addition to the platform serving the through line, there was a second platform on the opposite side of the station building to provide a passing loop. There was also a freight siding.

Fares
In 1910 the third class fare from Albany to Kingston was 3/6 (three shillings and sixpence); first class was about double.

See also
Railways of Jamaica
Railway stations in Jamaica

References

External links
Aerial view of site.
Stamp cancellations.

Bibliography

Railway stations in Jamaica
Buildings and structures in Saint Mary Parish, Jamaica
Railway stations opened in 1896
Railway stations closed in 1978